Khin Thet Htay is the acting First Lady of Myanmar. She is also the current Second Lady of Myanmar. She initially became acting First Lady when her spouse became acting President for ten days in March 2018. She became acting First Lady again after the coup d'état on 1 February 2021. She also served as Vice President of Myanmar Women's Affairs Federation in early 2009.

Her husband Myint Swe was sworn in as acting president under the Constitution of Myanmar, which also called for Pyidaungsu Hluttaw to select a new President within seven days of Htin Kyaw's resignation.

On 2 March 2023, the military government awarded her the title of Agga Maha Thiri Thudhamma Theingi, one of the country’s highest religious honors, for significantly contributing to the flowering and propagation of Buddhism.

References 

First ladies of Myanmar
Year of birth missing (living people)
Living people